"Loco" is a single by the band Coal Chamber. It is one of the band's best known songs.

Music video
The video starts off with the ice cream truck (which is on the cover of the album Coal Chamber) rounding a turn and slowly coming to a stop with the beginning of the song playing. When Fafara says the opening line of "Pull", a crazed ice cream truck driver gets off the truck and heads into a nearby house which is home to the members of Coal Chamber. One by one, the driver hunts them down and forces them to stare into a View Master, which shows Coal Chamber performing the song. Bassist Rayna Foss is first, as the driver sneaks up on her as she is playing a game of jacks. Singer B. Dez Fafara is next, as the driver surprises him while he is sewing a stuffed animal's head back on. Guitarist Miguel "Meegs" Rascon is the next victim, caught by the driver while he is staring at an empty rocking chair. Drummer Mikey "Bug" Cox is the final victim, as the driver victimizes him while he is sitting on a mattress watching TV. At the end of the video, the driver has tied the band members to chairs in the basement of the house and has attached a View Master to each member's head with duct tape. The driver then leaves the house and drives away.

It was filmed in October 1997. The truck driver is largely believed to be played by Ozzy Osbourne, but it's not true, as confirmed by Fafara himself.

Track listing

References

1997 songs
Coal Chamber songs
1997 debut singles
Roadrunner Records singles